Webspinners: Tales of Spider-Man is a comic book series starring Spider-Man published by Marvel Comics for 18 issues from January 1999 to June 2000.

Publication history
Webspinners was created in 1999 after a consolidation of Marvel's Spider-Man comics line that saw cancellations and relaunches of the existing ongoing series.  The title was conceived as a new anthology series that was divided into multi-issue story arcs, each of which featured a different creative team and told a story from a different part of Spider-Man's history. Writers for the series include creators new and old to the franchise such as J. M. DeMatteis, Keith Giffen, Joe Kelly, Paul Jenkins, Howard Mackie, Rurik Tyler, and Tom DeFalco.

The series was cancelled in June 2000, but would be replaced by successive releases of Spider-Man mini-series with similar concepts to the cancelled title that lasted until June 2001: Spider-Man: Death & Destiny, Spider-Man: Revenge of the Green Goblin, Spider-Man: Mysterio Manifesto, and Spider-Man: Lifeline.

Creators

Collected editions
 Spider-Man: Webspinners - The Complete Collection  - Collects all 18 issues of Webspinners as well as material from Shadows & Light #2 & 3
 Peter Parker: Spider-Man - A Day in the Life  - A collection of Peter Parker: Spider-Man issues written by Paul Jenkins which includes his Webspinners story in issues 10-12
 Carnage Classic  - A collection of stories featuring Carnage including Webspinners #13-14

References

External links 
Spider-Man at Marvel.com

Comics by J. M. DeMatteis
Spider-Man titles